Jixian may refer to the following places and jurisdictions in China :

 Jixian County (集贤县), Heilongjiang
 Ji County, Shanxi (吉县), or Jixian
 Ji County, Tianjin (蓟县), or Jixian
 Ji County, Henan (汲县), or Jixian, now Weihui City, and a Catholic diocese
 Jixian Township (集贤乡), Chongzhou, Sichuan

Subdistricts
 Jixian Subdistrict, Shuangyashan (集贤街道), in Sifangtai District, Shuangyashan, Heilongjiang
 Jixian Subdistrict, Shenyang (集贤街道), in Heping District, Shenyang, Liaoning

Towns (集贤镇)
 Jixian, Jixian County, Heilongjiang
 Jixian, Shaanxi, in Zhouzhi County